Kelahmet is a village in Tarsus district of Mersin Province, Turkey. At , it is in Çukurova (Cilicia of the antiquity) and to the south of Tarsus. It is situated to the north of the Mediterranean Sea coast and west of the Berdan River. The population of Kelahmet was 720  as of 2011. Situated in fertile plains, farming is the major economic activity with cotton and greenhouse vegetables as popular crops.

References

Villages in Tarsus District